Ríkharður Daðason (born 26 April 1972) is an Icelandic former professional footballer who played as a striker for Fram Reykjavik, KR, Kalamata, Viking, Stoke City, Lillestrøm and Fredrikstad.

Education 
Ríkharður graduated from Columbia University, where he played on the varsity football team, in 1996 and was inducted into Columbia's athletics hall of fame in 2010.

Club career
Ríkharður started his career in Fram Reykjavik, and later moved to KR where he became top goalscorer in the Úrvalsdeild in 1996 with 14. His KR career was interrupted by an unsuccessful spell in Greek football with Kalamata. In 1998, he moved to Norwegian club Viking, and after scoring at least 15 goals three seasons in a row he was signed by English club Stoke City in the summer of 2000. Stoke were at the time under the control of an Icelandic board and Ríkharður was one of a number fellow countrymen at join up at the Britannia Stadium, Stoke had to wait until the Norwegian finished before Ríkharður could join them and he made a great start scoring the winning goal against Barnsley with his first touch.

He failed to build on such a good start and scored seven more goals in 2000–01 and became more used by Guðjón Þórðarson as a substitute. He scored four goals in 13 matches in 2001–02 and was released by the club at the end of the season. He returned to Norway and played for Lillestrøm and Fredrikstad before ending his career with a return to Fram.

International career
Ríkharður made his debut for Iceland in a May 1991 friendly against Malta as a substitute for Grétar Einarsson.  He played his last international match in 2003, having been capped 44 times and scoring 14 goals. Ríkharður scored a legendary goal against France, then recent World Cup Champions, on 5 September 1998. The game ended with a 1–1 draw. He was the top goal scorer of the 2000–01 Nordic Football Championship with 4 goals.

Career statistics

Club

International

Scores and results list Iceland's goal tally first, score column indicates score after each Ríkharður goal.

References

External links
 
 

1972 births
Living people
Rikhardur Dadason
Association football forwards
Rikhardur Dadason
Rikhardur Dadason
Rikhardur Dadason
Viking FK players
Stoke City F.C. players
Lillestrøm SK players
Fredrikstad FK players
Kalamata F.C. players
Rikhardur Dadason
Rikhardur Dadason
Eliteserien players
Norwegian First Division players
English Football League players
Super League Greece players
Columbia Lions men's soccer players
Expatriate footballers in Greece
Rikhardur Dadason
Expatriate footballers in Norway
Rikhardur Dadason
Expatriate footballers in England
Rikhardur Dadason
Rikhardur Dadason